Torsion may refer to:

Science
 Torsion (mechanics), the twisting of an object due to an applied torque
 Torsion of spacetime, the field used in Einstein–Cartan theory and
 Alternatives to general relativity
 Torsion angle, in chemistry

Biology and medicine
 Torsion fracture or spiral fracture, a bone fracture when torque is applied
 Organ torsion, twisting that interrupts the blood supply to that organ:
 Splenic torsion, causing splenic infarction
 Ovarian torsion
 Testicular torsion
 Penile torsion, a congenital condition
 Torsion of the digestive tract in some domestic animals:
 Torsion, a type of horse colic
 Gastric torsion, or gastric dilatation volvulus
 Torsion (gastropod), a developmental feature of all gastropods

Mathematics
 Torsion of a curve
 Torsion tensor, in differential geometry
 Torsion (algebra), in ring theory
 Torsion group, in group theory and arithmetic geometry
 Tor functor, the derived functors of the tensor product of modules over a ring
 Torsion-free module, in algebra
 Analytic torsion (Reidemeister torsion, R-torsion, Franz torsion, de Rham torsion, Ray-Singer torsion), a topological invariant of manifolds
 Whitehead torsion, in geometric topology

Other uses
 Torsion field (pseudoscience), a field alleged to make faster-than-light communication and paranormal phenomena possible